The 2003 Seattle Seahawks season was the franchise's 28th season in the National Football League (NFL), the second season in Seahawks Stadium and the 5th under head coach Mike Holmgren.  After going 31–33 in his first four years as head coach, the Seahawks went undefeated at home for the first time in franchise history and improved to 10–6, thus making the NFC playoffs as a wild card team, the first of nine playoff appearances in twelve seasons. However, the team fell 33–27 to the Green Bay Packers in the opening round due to an interception returned for a touchdown by Green Bay's Al Harris in overtime. Following the season, Hall of Fame defensive tackle John Randle retired after 14 seasons.

2003 NFL Draft

Final roster
{{NFL final roster
|Year=2003
|TeamName=Seattle Seahawks
|BC1=#00338D
|FC1=white
|BDC1=#008542
|offseason=no
|ufa=no
|rfa=no
|erfa=no
|Active=53
|Inactive=8
|PS=4

|Quarterbacks=

 *

|Running Backs=
 *
 KR
 FB
 KR
 FB

|Wide Receivers=
 *
 PR

|Tight Ends=
|Offensive Linemen=
 G
 T
 T
 G *
 T *
 C
 T
 C
 T

|Defensive Linemen=
 DT
 DE
 DE
 DE
 DT
 DE
 DE
 DT
 DT

|Linebackers=
 OLB
 OLB
 MLB
 MLB
 OLB
 OLB
 OLB
 OLB

|Defensive Backs=
 FS
 CB
 CB
 FS/SS
 CB
 SS
 CB
 CB

|Special Teams=
 K
 LS
 P

|Reserve Lists=

 

|Practice Squad=

}}Seattle Seahawks 2003 Roster accessed November 28, 2018.

     Starters in bold.
 (*) Denotes players that were selected for the 2004 Pro Bowl.

Schedule

Preseason

Source: Seahawks Media Guides2004 Seahawks Media Guide , accessed February 14, 2015.

Regular seasonBold' indicates division opponents.
Source: 2003 NFL season results

Postseason

Standings

Game Summaries

Preseason

Week P1: vs. San Diego Chargers

Week P2: at Indianapolis Colts

Week P3: vs. Kansas City Chiefs

Week P4: at Denver Broncos

Regular season

Week 1: vs. New Orleans Saints

Shaun Alexander bulled the Seahawks to a 27–10 win as he rushed for 108 yards and a touchdown while also catching a touchdown. The Saints fumbled away the ball three times and also committed eleven penalties.

Week 2: at Arizona Cardinals

After forcing four turnovers by the Saints, the Seahawks picked off Jeff Blake and Josh McCown four times while swallowing two fumbles en route to a 38–0 shutout win. Maurice Morris and Shaun Alexander split carries for 118 yards and a touchdown while Matt Hasselbeck ran in a touchdown and threw another.

Week 3: vs. St. Louis Rams

The Rams and Seahawks began to build a bitter rivalry as the two clubs met with the Rams at 1–1 and the Seahawks 2–0. A Rams goalline fumble led to a Seahawks touchdown before the Rams reeled off 23 points by the fourth quarter.  Then Matt Hasselbeck erupted to two fourth-quarter touchdowns and the 24–23 Seahawks win.

Week 5: at Green Bay Packers

Mike Holmgren returned to Lambeau Field and saw his Seahawks routed 35–13 by his old team, the Packers. Brett Favre threw two touchdowns while Ahman Green and Tony Fisher combined for 141 rushing yards and three touchdowns. Matt Hasselbeck was intercepted once while Shaun Alexander managed 102 yards and a score.

Week 6: vs. San Francisco 49ers

Former Seahawks coach Dennis Erickson came to Seattle and saw his 49ers fall behind 17–0 in the second quarter. The Niners clawed back but a failed point after kick left them trailing 17–16 in the third; it proved fatal as the Seahawks won 20–19 on a late 37-yard field goal.

Week 7: vs. Chicago Bears

Despite two Chris Chandler interceptions and just 211 yards of offense, the Bears erased a 17–6 Seahawks lead and tied the game in the fourth quarter.  The Seahawks then finished it off on Shaun Alexander's 25-yard score and a 24–17 win.

Week 8: at Cincinnati Bengals

The Seahawks season began to take on a concerning problem of road performances. Their second straight road loss and sixth in their last two seasons came in a game where the lead tied or changed seven times; the Seahawks fumbled twice and Matt Hasselbeck was intercepted three times; Chad Johnson's 53-yard touchdown catch gave the Bengals the 27–24 win.

Week 9: vs. Pittsburgh Steelers

The first three quarters were a battle of field goals, then in the fourth up 9–6 the Seahawks scored twice while Tommy Maddox had a touchdown. The 23–16 Seahawks win left them at 6–2 with the Steelers 2–6.

Week 10: at Washington Redskins

For the third straight road game the Seahawks fell short, blowing a 14–3 lead as Patrick Ramsey and Rod Gardner combined for three touchdowns. The Seahawks lost two fumbles while Matt Hasselbeck was intercepted once.

Week 11: vs. Detroit Lions

Bobby Engram scored twice, on a 34-yard catch from Matt Hasselbeck and an 83-yard punt return.  The Seahawks and Lions combined for 49 points in the first half before being shut out in the second as Seattle won 35–14.

Week 12: at Baltimore Ravens

Former Seahawks beat writer Clare Farnsworth called this game "one of the monumental collapses in Seahawks history." After going 29 minutes with just a pair of field goals and resultant 3–3 tie, the Seahawks scored 14 points to end the first half, then built a 41–24 lead in the fourth quarter. Ed Reed scored on a blocked punt, then Anthony Wright erupted with huge throws to Frank Sanders and Marcus Robinson and the score was now 41–38 Seahawks. In the final 33 seconds an administrative mistake on a Seahawks run and a withdrawn ineligible player penalty by referee Tom White stopped the clock and saved the Ravens from using their final timeout; they stopped a Matt Hasselbeck sneak on fourth down, then a pass interference penalty set up Matt Stover's tying field goal.  In overtime ex-Raven Trent Dilfer had to come in for one play but the Seahawks had to punt and the Ravens won on another Stover field goal.  It was Seattle's fourth straight road loss.

Week 13: vs. Cleveland Browns

Still angry over the loss to the Ravens, the Seahawks finished the AFC North portion of their schedule by crushing the Browns 34–7; Andre King scored on a blocked Seahawks punt in the fourth quarter but by then Matt Hasselbeck had thrown three touchdowns and the Seahawks had forced three Browns turnovers.

Week 14: at Minnesota Vikings

The Seahawks' road struggles continued as Randy Moss and Kelly Campbell caught touchdowns from Daunte Culpepper while Matt Hasselbeck was picked off by Mike Nattiel and Nattiel scored from 80 yards out. The Vikings won 34–7 by outgaining the Seahawks 463 total yards to 258, leaving both teams at 8–5.

Week 15: at St. Louis Rams

The Seahawks fell out of contention for the NFC West as the Rams won 27–22 to go to 11–3 with the Seahawks clawing for a wildcard spot at 8–6 with their sixth straight road loss. The deciding play came in the final seconds when Hasselbeck launched a Hail Mary pass from the 50; a referee stumbled and Bobby Engram tripped over him short of the goalline as the pass was nearly intercepted.

Week 16: vs. Arizona Cardinals

The Seahawks climbed back into wildcard contention as they sacked Josh McCown eight times, Shaun Alexander rushed for 135 yards and two touchdowns, Matt Hasselbeck and Trent Dilfer combined for a touchdown and an interception apiece, and Seattle won 28–10. Seattle stood tied with the Vikings (45–20 winners over Kansas City) and Green Bay (who would blast the Oakland Raiders 41–7 on Monday Night Football'' the next night) all at 9–6 with the Cowboys holding the first wildcard at 10–5.

Week 17: at San Francisco 49ers

Seattle finally won a second road game as they clawed from down 17–14 with a Matt Hasselbeck touchdown and a field goal; Jeff Garcia's 4th down incompletion sealed a 24–17 Seahawks win. The game was the second of a pre-New Year's Saturday triple header; the Seahawks thus had to wait until Sunday before a win by Green Bay, a loss by Dallas, and a last-second loss by Minnesota sorted out the NFC playoff picture, putting Seattle as the conference's fifth seed.

Postseason

Seattle entered the postseason as the #5 seed in the NFC.

NFC Wild Card Playoff: at #4 Green Bay Packers

With Nate Poole of the Cardinals in attendance (a result of knocking the Vikings out of the playoffs the week before) in a mild snowstorm, the Packers hosted the upstart Seahawks.  Green Bay clawed to a 13-6 halftime lead, but in the third quarter Shawn Alexander touchdowns put the Seahawks up 20-13.  Two Ahman Green touchdown rushes in the fourth quarter put the Packers back up 27-20.  After the Seahawks tied the game Brett Favre completed three straight passes for 41 yards in Green Bay's final drive, but Ryan Longwell misfired on the ensuing 47-yard field goal attempt.  For the overtime coin toss the Seahawks won; Matt Hasselbeck brashly stated to referee Bernie Kukar "We want the ball and we're gonna score!"  The boast was picked up on stadium and FOX Sports television microphones and became a source of infamy; after completing two passes for twelve yards Hasselbeck targeted Alex Bannister but the ball was intercepted by Al Harris at the Packers 48-yard-line and Harris scored, ending the game 33-27 and ending Seattle's season.

References

External links
 Seahawks draft history at NFL.com
 2003 NFL season results at NFL.com

Seattle
Seattle Seahawks seasons
Seattle Seahawks